Kelly Heuchan  (born 30 January 1980) is a former Australian female water polo player. She has three children with her ex-husband Steve Parks, an American rower.  

She was a member of the Australia women's national water polo team, playing as a driver, and participated at the 2004 Summer Olympics. On the club level she played for Fremantle Marlins in Australia.

References

External links
 

1980 births
Living people
Australian female water polo players
Water polo players at the 2004 Summer Olympics
Olympic water polo players of Australia
Sportspeople from Perth, Western Australia